Mirim Lake may refer to:
 Mirim Lake (Bolivia)
 Mirim Lake (Brazil)